Shenzhen Foreign Languages School is a middle school and high school in China which specializes in language studies. Located in Shenzhen, a coastal special economic zone in Guangdong Province, China, it provides students with study in English, Japanese, French, German, Spanish and Russian. Besides excellence in languages, Shenzhen Foreign Languages School is well known for its performance in the Chinese university administration examination, commonly known as the Gaokao. In a 2016 ranking of Chinese high schools that send students to study in American universities, Shenzhen Foreign Language School ranked number 19 in mainland China in terms of the number of students entering top American universities.

History 

The first Principal Mr. Gong Guoxiang started the school in 1990, with nine teachers, 50 students, and three classrooms. In 1994, the school, with its middle and high school department, moved to its new site in the heart of the city at Hongli Road and Yannan Road. It was also the Center for Japanese Language Research back then. A primary school was launched in 2000.

In 2001, the school launched its branch school (Shenzhen Foreign Languages School Branch). Led by principal Ms. Wu, it is located in Longgang District, Shenzhen. However, it does not offer foreign languages other than English.

In 2003, the Senior High Department was moved to the seaside Yantian District, at the foot of Wutong Mountain. Today, Shenzhen Foreign Languages School has been expanded to an integrated school-system with Primary School, Secondary School, High School, Longgang Branch, and a kindergarten.

Admissions
It has an entrance examination for admittance to the junior high school level. In 2004 it had about 6th grade 1,300 test takers and planned to accept about 384 for grade 7. That year it introduced a new aspect of the examination where students take 30 minutes to review material in a language other than English and then answer questions in the remaining 30 minutes.

Activities 
The students are involved in a variety of academic contests, extracurricular activities, varsity sports and international communication. It has a foreign exchange program with Alcester Grammar School in Warwickshire, England.

With the help of a recently established Advanced Placement center, graduates of the school have gone on abroad to become students of well-known universities such as Cambridge, Oxford, Harvard, Brown, Rice, Chicago, Berkeley, Stanford, Swarthmore, Cornell, Boston College, Carnegie Mellon University, Duke, and Pomona.

Student activities

 Arts Festival
 Foreign Languages Festival
 Sports Festival
 Science and Technology Festival
 spring outing/autumn outing(two times a year, regardless of the weather)
 Lei Feng day sale
 Basketball
 Football
 Badminton
 Volleyball
 Table Tennis

Student clubs

 Meteorological & Astronomical Observatory（SFLSMAO）
 Economic Association
 Cooking Club
 Hip Hop Club
 Yoga Club
 Kungfu Club
 Music Club
 Costume Designing Club
 Designing Association
 Magic Club
 Model United Nations
 Comic and Animation Club
 Model Court
 Model United Nations
 Environmental Protection Association
 Biological Experiments Club
 Chemistry Experiment Club
 Chess Club
 Frisbee Club
 Basketball Club
 Football Club
 Volleyball Club
 Badminton Club
 Orienteering Club
 Taekwondo Club

International school division 
Shen Wai International School is the division for students with foreign, Republic of China on Taiwan, and Hong Kong and Macao passports.

Sister schools 
Hangzhou Foreign Language School: http://www.chinahw.net/html_en/template/aboutus.html

Shenzhen Baihe Foreign Languages School 
Originally Shenzhen Foreign Languages School Branch, but separated from SFLS in 2007. It is the first and only public middle school that offers boarding in Shenzhen. After the separation, Baihe Foreign Languages school (or BFLS) became a competitive "opponent" of SFLS in the Chinese Senior High School Enrollment Examination, known as Zhongkao. However, those two schools remain in the first two in ranking of academics programmes. Recently, it started an experimental Japanese Language and Culture classes.

See also 
List of Foreign Language Schools in China

References

External links
 Shenzhen Foreign Languages School

Foreign-language high schools in China
High schools in Shenzhen
Educational institutions established in 1990
1990 establishments in China